The 2016 SEABA Championship for Women was the 9th edition of the SEABA Championship for Women. It was held in Malacca City, Malaysia from 20 to 26 September.

The Malaysia Basketball Association announced Malaysia's hosting of the tournament in May 2016.

The Philippines secured their second title after they won over host Malaysia with the scoreline of 77–73 in September 24 with games still to be played. By that time only Malaysia could tie them by points but the winner over the other rule ensures the Philippines' title.

Round robin

|}

Final standings

Awards

Most Valuable Player
  Afril Bernardino

Team of the Tournament
  Gabriel Sophia
  Yap Fook Yee
  Afril Bernardino
  Allana Lim
  Lim Jia Min

References

2016
International women's basketball competitions hosted by Malaysia
2016 in women's basketball
2016–17 in Asian basketball
2016–17 in Philippine basketball
2016–17 in Malaysian basketball
2016–17 in Indonesian basketball
2016–17 in Singaporean basketball
2016–17 in Thai basketball
2016–17 in Vietnamese basketball
2016 in Laotian sport
September 2016 sports events in Asia